2002 F.C. Tokyo season

Competitions

Domestic results

J. League 1

Emperor's Cup

J. League Cup

Player statistics

Other pages
 J. League official site
 List of F.C.Tokyo players 2002 - J.League Official site

Tokyo
2002